The 2022 Netball Quad Series was the seventh Netball Quad Series of test matches, contested by four of the five highest ranked nations in netball. The series was played in England during January 2022, several months before the 2022 Commonwealth Games.

Australia were the series champions, defeating England in the final by 58–46 to retain their title won in 2019.

Teams

Squads

On 10 January 2022, Jo Harten withdrew from the England squad after testing positive for COVID-19.

Round-robin stage
The four teams played each other once in the round-robin stage, from which the top two sides advanced to the final to compete for the Quad Series title. The bottom two sides went to the third-place playoff.

Updated to 18 January 2022

Round 1

Round 2

Round 3

Finals

Third-place final

Final

References

 

2022
2022 in netball
2022 in Australian netball
2022 in New Zealand netball
2022 in English netball
2022 in South African women's sport
International netball competitions hosted by England
Netball Quad Series
2022 sports events in London